Adarius Taylor (born  Adarius Glanton on September 21, 1990) is an American football linebacker who is currently a free agent. He first enrolled at Iowa Western Community College then Eastern Arizona College before transferring to Florida Atlantic University. He attended Lake Gibson High School in Lakeland, Florida. He has also been a member of the Tampa Bay Buccaneers, Cleveland Browns, and Carolina Panthers.

Early years
Taylor participated in football, track and basketball for the Lake Gibson High School Braves.

College career
Taylor first played college football for the Eastern Arizona College Gila Monsters. He was named first-team All-Conference and All-Region as a sophomore, recording 85 tackles, 5.5 sacks, and two forced fumbles. He later transferred to play for the Florida Atlantic Owls from 2012 to 2013.

Professional career

Carolina Panthers

2014
On May 10, 2014, the Carolina Panthers signed Taylor to a three-year, $1.53 million contract that includes a signing bonus of $16,000. Throughout training camp, Taylor competed for a roster spot against Anthony Morales, Jason Williams, and Denicos Allen. On August 30, 2014, Taylor was waived as part of the Panthers’ final roster cuts, but was signed to the team's practice squad on September 1, 2014.

On October 19, 2014, Taylor made his professional regular season debut as the Panthers’ lost 38-17 at the Green Bay Packers. On December 21, 2014, Taylor earned his first career start in place of A. J. Klein who sustained an ankle injury the previous week. Taylor finished the Panthers’ 17-13 win against the Cleveland Browns with a season-high six combined tackles. In Week 17, Taylor recorded five combined tackles and forced the first fumble of his career during a 34-3 win at the Atlanta Falcons. He finished his rookie season in 2014 with 12 combined tackles (eight solo) in ten games and two starts.

2015
Taylor entered training camp as a backup linebacker and competed for a roster spot against A.J. Klein. On September 5, 2015, the Carolina Panthers released Taylor as part of their final roster cuts and signed him to their practice squad the next day.

Tampa Bay Buccaneers
On November 30, 2015, the Tampa Bay Buccaneers signed Taylor off of the Panther's practice squad. Head coach Lovie Smith named Taylor the third middle linebacker on the depth chart, behind Kwon Alexander and Bruce Carter. Taylor appeared in five games, primarily on special teams, and did not record a statistic during the 2015 NFL season.

2016
On January 6, 2016, the Tampa Bay Buccaneers announced their decision to fire head coach Lovie Smith after they finished with a 9-7 record and did not qualify for the playoffs in 2015. On January 15, 2016, the Tampa Bay Buccaneers officially promoted offensive coordinator Dirk Koetter to head coach. During training camp in 2016, Taylor competed for a roster spot as a backup middle linebacker against Luke Rhodes. On November 3, 2016, Taylor collected a season-high six solo tackles during the Buccaneers’ 43-28 loss against the Atlanta Falcons in Week 9. On January 1, 2017, against the Carolina Panthers, long snapper Andrew DePaola suffered a torn ACL late in the third quarter. Taylor then served as the long snapper for a successful extra point late in the fourth quarter to help the Buccaneers win by a score of 17–16. He finished the 2016 NFL season with 13 combined tackles (11 solo) in 16 games and zero starts.

2017
On February 28, 2017, the Tampa Bay Buccaneers assigned a one-year, $690,000 tender to Taylor as a restricted free agent. On April 18, 2017, Taylor signed his one-year, $690,000 restricted free agent tender to remain with the Tampa Bay Buccaneers. Throughout training camp, Taylor competed against Devante Bond, Kendell Beckwith, and Cameron Lynch to be the starting strongside linebacker after it was left vacant by the departure of Daryl Smith. Head coach Dirk Koetter named Taylor the backup middle linebacker, behind Kwon Alexander, to begin the regular season in 2017.

In Week 3, Taylor collected a season-high eight combined tackles during a 34-17 loss at the Minnesota Vikings. On October 5, 2017, Taylor recorded seven combined tackles, forced a fumble, and made his first career sack during a 19-14 loss against the New England Patriots in Week 5. Taylor sacked Patriots’ quarterback Tom Brady for a six-yard loss in the third quarter and forced a fumble by Brady that was recovered by teammate Will Clarke. On December 18, 2017, Taylor started in place of Lavonte David who was inactive due to a hamstring injury and made four combined tackles before being carted off the field during the third quarter of the Buccaneers’ 24-21 loss against the Atlanta Falcons in Week 15. Taylor sustained a broken tibia and fibula after colliding with teammate Robert Ayers as both attempted to sack Falcons’ quarterback Matt Ryan. On December 20, 2017, the Tampa Bay Buccaneers officially placed Taylor on injured reserve. Taylor finished the 2017 NFL season with 31 combined tackles (22 solo), one pass deflection, and one sack in 14 games and four starts.

2018
During training camp, Taylor competed against Devante Bond to be the starting strongside linebacker. The role was left vacant after Kendell Beckwith sustained a broken ankle during a car accident. Head coach Dirk Koetter named Taylor the strongside linebacker to begin the regular season, alongside Lavonte David and middle linebacker Kwon Alexander. In Week 9, he collected a season-high nine combined tackles (four solo) during a 42-28 loss at the Carolina Panthers.

Cleveland Browns
On March 14, 2019, Taylor signed a two-year contract with the Cleveland Browns.

Taylor was released by the Browns on February 17, 2020.

Carolina Panthers (second stint)
On July 27, 2020, Taylor was signed by the Carolina Panthers. He played in nine games before being placed on injured reserve on November 11, 2020. He was activated off of injured reserve on December 12.

Personal life
Taylor had his last name changed to honor his father Basil George Taylor who died when Taylor was 16 years old. Before he changed his last name, it was Glanton, which is his mother's last name. Taylor's father was born in St. Catherine, Jamaica and immigrated to the USA in 1979.

References

External links
NFL Draft Scout
Carolina Panthers bio

Living people
1990 births
Players of American football from Florida
Sportspeople from Bartow, Florida
American football linebackers
African-American players of American football
Eastern Arizona Gila Monsters football players
Florida Atlantic Owls football players
Carolina Panthers players
Tampa Bay Buccaneers players
Cleveland Browns players
21st-century African-American sportspeople